is a manga series written and illustrated by AI Morinaga. It’s published by Kodansha in Japan and Del Rey Manga in America. The series ran for 14 volumes, ending in 2005. The first eight volumes were released in North America.

Series Overview 
Hana Suzuki loves only two things in life: eating and sleeping. So, when her handsome classmate Izumi Oda talks her into joining the school hockey club, how is she going to survive getting up early, working hard, and playing well with others? True, the Grand Hockey Club is full of boys - super-cute boys at that - so maybe it won't be so bad after all…

Characters 
Hana Suzuki
Hana Suzuki (female lead character) is an average 16-year-old high school girl, her hobbies include sleeping and eating. She usually acts tomboyishly but can be girly when she needed. She is very conscious of her chest. She becomes goalie on the team due to the unnatural things she can do in her sleep, like blocking everything from going into the net. 

Izumi Oda
Izumi Oda is a super rich 2nd year high school student and captain of the Grand Hockey Club. His favorite phrase is "I am the law" and expects everyone to do what he says. He blackmailed Hana to join the club after Izumi's car got hit by Hana by making her to think that the car wasn't insured, when it actually was. 

Takashi Itoigawa
Takashi is a 2nd year high school student and is Izumi's closest friend. He is the vice-captain of the club. Takashi always goes after Izumi and bears a grudge against Hana for being so close to him. Even if he does hate her, he will do anything to get Izumi happy. 

Natsuki Serizawa
Natsuki is in his 2nd year of high school and was appointed as Hana's snack person. Natsuki is rich because his family owns a jewellery company. He is often mistaken as a girl due to his face being cuter than a girl's, but is actually the most manly member of the hockey club. 

Kinta Ayuhara
Kinta Ayuhara is a 1st year high school student and is Ginta's older twin. His first love is Rin-chan from St. Johannes Girls' Academy. But, because Hana gave him the wrong information on what kind of guy Rin-chan likes, his first love did not work out. 

Ginta Ayuhara
Ginta Ayuhara is in his first year in high school and he is Kinta's younger twin. His first love is Ran-chan, the younger twin of his brother's first love. He believes (like his brother) that they look nothing alike and have opposite taste in girls. Because Hana gave him the wrong information, his love also did not work out.

Reviews
"Morinaga flexes her artistic skill in volume one placing scenes in various settings. Both pacing and storytelling are fluid. It's remarkable how everything comes together in this volume - even the absurd." — Kai-Ming Cha, IGN.

"If you're expecting a gimmick with this one, you'll be both disappointed and satisfied—disappointed, perhaps, that this isn't really about sports, but satisfied at the sheer looniness of the comedy here." — Kevin Gifford, Newtype USA.

"A reverse harem story done in traditional shojo style, the first volume of this tale of a girl who gets drawn into an otherwise all-guy hockey club won't dazzle you with its quality but may be enough to amuse." — Theron Martin, Anime News Network.

"A lot of the credit goes to Del Rey's expert translation, which showcases Ai Morinaga's wacky humor. You'll actually learn something about Japanese food, thanks to Hana's insatiable hunger, so you can say with a straight face that My Heavenly Hockey Club is totally educational." — Jennifer Webb, Teenreads.com.

"This volume has plenty of funny jokes, but I felt it wasn’t quite as funny as the first. I’m also disappointed with the continued lack of hockey. I understand the joke factor of always having something interrupt the hockey matches, but I’m growing a little bored with it." — Matthew Alexander, Mania.

"A fun comedy with plenty of romantic antics that will have the ladies rolling in the aisles (and maybe even the guys too?). Consistent in both art and story, My Heavenly Hockey Club is a bit of light entertainment that isn’t to be missed." — Scott Campbell, activeAnime.

"Even when the events are predictable — as in the chapter with the twins in love, where Hana messes up her reconnaissance mission — they’re still very funny. This is a neat, happy read if you’re looking for school comedy." — Johanna Draper Carlson, Comics Worth Reading.

References

External links
 

Ai Morinaga
Del Rey Manga
Ice hockey books
Kodansha manga
Romance anime and manga
Sports anime and manga